Johannes "Hannes" Seifert (6 October 1915 – 25 November 1943) was a German Luftwaffe military aviator and fighter ace during World War II. He is credited with 57 aerial victories achieved in 439 combat missions. This figure includes 11 aerial victories on the Eastern Front, and further 46 victories over the Western Allies, including three four-engined bombers.

Born in Pinneberg, Seifert grew up in the Weimar Republic and Nazi Germany. He joined the military service in the Luftwaffe and was trained as a fighter pilot. Following flight training, he was posted to Jagdgeschwader 26 "Schlageter" (JG 26—26th Fighter Wing). Flying with this wing, Seifert claimed his first aerial victory on 10 May 1940 on the Western Front during the Battle of France fighter aircraft. He was made Staffelkapitän (squadron leader) of 3. Staffel (3rd squadron) of JG 26 in March 1940 and in July 1941, Gruppenkommandeur (group commander) of I. Gruppe of JG 26. Following his 36th aerial victory, he was awarded the Knight's Cross of the Iron Cross on 7 June 1942. In January 1943, his unit was posted to the Eastern Front. In September 1943, he was given command II. Gruppe of JG 26. He was killed in action in mid-air collision with a Lockheed P-38 Lightning on 25 November 1943 near Béthune, France.

Early life and career
Johannes "Hannes" Seifert was born on 6 October 1915 at Pinneberg, Holstein. Jagdgeschwader 26 "Schlageter" (JG 26—26th Fighter Wing) was created on 1 May 1939 in Düsseldorf by renaming Jagdgeschwader 132 (JG 132—132nd Fighter Wing) and was commanded by Oberst Eduard Ritter von Schleich, a flying ace of World War I. Sources differ as to when exactly Seifert joined JG 26. According to Caldwell, Seifert was among the first pilots assigned to this unit following his training as a fighter pilot. While Mathews and Foreman claim that Seifert first served in another unit flying the Messerschmitt Bf 110 heavy fighter during the Invasion of Poland before transferring to JG 26. His brother Gerhard was also a pilot with JG 26, shot down and killed in action on 4 February 1943.

World War II
World War II in Europe began on Friday 1 September 1939 when German forces invaded Poland. On 1 March 1940, Seifert was appointed Staffelkapitän (squadron leader) of 3. Staffel (3rd squadron) of JG 26. This squadron was subordinated to I. Gruppe (1st group) under the command of Major Gotthard Handrick. Seifert claimed his first aerial victory on 10 May 1940 during the Battle of the Netherlands, as part of the Battle of France. The claim was made over a Royal Netherlands Air Force Fokker D.XXI fighter shot down near Rotterdam.

On 28 May, during the Battle of Dunkirk, I. Gruppe engaged in combat with Royal Air Force (RAF) Supermarine Spitfire fighters from the Hornchurch Wing over the English Channel east of Dunkirk. Fighter pilots from the Gruppe claimed six aerial victories in this encounter. This figure includes a Spitfire fighter claimed by Seifert between Dover and Ostend. Only one Spitfire was lost by the RAF, making a forced landing near Dunkirk on the beach. Two further Spitfires force landed in England. He claimed a No. 103 Squadron Fairey Battle light bomber north of Beauvais on 8 June. This claim took his total to four aerial victories, his last during the Battle of France as he was injured that day.

Group Commander
On 10 July 1941, the Gruppenkommandeur (group commander) of I. Gruppe, Hauptmann Rolf Pingel, was shot down over England and became a prisoner of war. The next day, Seifert succeeded Pingel in this capacity, a position he would hold for nearly two years. Seifert's command of 3. Staffel was passed on to Oberleutnant Walter Otte. Seifert claimed his first aerial victory during the Battle of Britain on 20 September. That day II. Gruppe of Lehrgeschwader 2 (LG 2—2nd Demonstration Wing) flew a fighter bomber attack on London. Supporting this attack, he claimed two Hawker Hurricane fighters from No. 253 Squadron over the Thames Estuary and Maidstone respectively.

In 1941 Fighter Command began the Circus offensive over Belgium and France, beginning on 10 January. JG 26 fought against these operations through the year to the final "Circus" on 8 November. Seifert claimed one of his first successes against "Circus" No. 19 on 23 June—he and Priller were the only claimants, while JG 26 suffered two crash-landed pilots. No. 616 and No. 485 (NZ) Squadron lost one Spitfire each, one pilot killed, the other captured, badly wounded. Combating "Circus" No. 45 on 11 July, Seifert claimed his 12th victory. JG 26 claimed seven in total while Jagdgeschwader 2 "Richthofen" (JG 2—2nd Fighter Wing) claimed three Spitfires. No. 11 Group reported five pilots missing. Against "Circus" No. 48, Seifert claimed another Spitfire as his wing claimed three, possibly four for one pilot killed—the RAF reported four missing. No. 54, No. 603, No. 611 and No. 616 Squadron were engaged with the third squadron losing three pilots. British reports state two of these collided while attacking a Bf 109. Seifert intercepted "Circus" No. 54 and 55 on 21 July, claiming a 15 Squadron Blenheim that had lost an engine to ground-fire and accounted for a Spitfire in the afternoon to inflate his tally to 15. Pilot Officer Johnnie Johnson, future Wing Leader, remarked that the "Circus" was "badly bounced [jumped]" and his formation did not see the enemy until they had opened fire. In the ensuing dogfight JG 26 claimed three for one loss—two Spitfires were lost and their pilots killed. One of them was Johnson's wingman. JG 26 claimed eight Spitfires from "Circus" No. 67 on 7 August. Seifert was among those successful pilots. Fighter Command reported four pilots missing and two wounded. The Germans suffered damage to two Bf 109s and one pilot was wounded. He claimed his 19th victory against "Circus" No. 82, in battle with 111 Squadron. "Circus" No. 95, on the morning onf 17 September, cost Fighter Command six killed, two captured and three wounded and nine Spitfires. Seifert claimed his 20th victory—Paul Galland achieved a victory against No. 603 Squadron. Seifert accounted for a 92 Squadron Spitfire on 3 October in combat with "Circus" No. 105—one of three losses sustained by that unit on the day. "Circus" No. 107 was intercepted by JG 2 and JG 26. The former claimed five Spitfires and the latter two; Seifert being one of those pilots. Fighter Command reported two losses. Postwar analysis suggests JG 26 were responsible for the two Kenley Wing losses and the claims of JG 2 are not supported in British casualty records. On 8 November Fighter Command flew the last "Circus" of the year. No. 308 Squadron encountered Seifert's unit while on a bomber escort mission and lost one pilot killed in action; the Spitfire purportedly fell to Seifert.

Fighter Command continued with "Circus" offensives in 1942. On 1 June, Fighter Command planned three "Circus" missions to France. Defending against these missions, Seifert claimed a No. 111 Squadron Spitfire shot down in the vicinity of Ostend. According to Caldwell, this claim was his 35th aerial victory. Authors Prien, Stemmer, Rodeike and Bock consider this claim unconfirmed, creating a one aerial victory discrepancy between the two sources as of this date. Seifert was awarded the Knight's Cross of the Iron Cross on 7 June 1942 for 36 aerial victories. He was the only member of JG 26 to receive this distinction in 1942. On 31 July 1942, the RAF targeted the Abbeville-Drucat Airfield with "Circus" No. 201. Twelve Douglas A-20 Havoc bombers supported by the North Weald Wing had already bombed the airfield before they were intercepted over the Somme Estuary.

Eastern Front
In January 1943, the Luftwaffe planned to move JG 26 to the Eastern Front. The idea was to exchange JG 26 with Jagdgeschwader 54 (JG 54—54th Fighter Wing) which supported Army Group North. The style of combat between the two fronts was quite different and overall the experiment was not a success; I. Gruppe of JG 26 was the only Gruppe of JG 26 to serve in Russia. On 21 January, I. Gruppe left France and arrived in Heiligenbeil, present-day Mamonovo, on 27 January. There, the Gruppe received factory-new Fw 190 A-5 and A-4 aircraft. On 31 January, I. Gruppe moved to Riga and two days later to an airfield named Rielbitzi at Lake Ilmen. Seifert claimed his first aerial victory on the Eastern Front during the Battle of Demyansk on 16 February when he shot down an Ilyushin Il-2 ground-attack aircraft. On 23 February, Soviet forces attempted to cross Lake Ilmen by boat which were attacked by Fw 190s of the Stabsschwarm (headquarters flight). On a later mission that day, Seifert was credited with the destruction of an Il-2. Five days later, he claimed two aerial victories, shooting down a Bell P-39 Airacobra and Lavochkin-Gorbunov-Gudkov LaGG-3, two fighter aircraft. On 1 March, Army Group Centre began a series of local retreats codenamed Operation Büffel, eliminating the Rzhev Salient by 23 March.

On 5 March, Seifert led his Stabsschwarm on a mission south of Lake Ilmen. On this mission, he wanted to evaluate the performance of a new pilot, Feldwebel Karl Preeg, who was recently transferred to I. Gruppe and was shot down and killed on this mission. Later that day, Seifert claimed a Petlyakov Pe-2 bomber and two Il-2 ground-attack aircraft destroyed. On 14 March, I. Gruppe moved to an airfield at Dno, southwest of Rielbitzi and west of Staraya Russa. That day, Seifert claimed a Pe-2 bomber destroyed, his 50th aerial victory. Two days later, he claimed an Il-2 ground-attack aircraft. On the transfer flight, Seifert shot down another Il-2 ground-attack aircraft. The next day, he claimed his 53rd and last aerial victory on the Eastern Front when he shot down a Mikoyan-Gurevich MiG-3 fighter aircraft.

On 20 May 1943, Seifert had to leave his command of I. Gruppe when transferred to a staff position with the Luftwaffe detachment of the Reichsluftfahrtministerium (RLM—Ministry of Aviation) in Bulgaria. Unknown to Seifert, his mother had invoked the 'last surviving son' ruling as his younger brother, Gerhard, had been killed in action, and was thus allowed to be removed from active combat duties. Hauptmann Fritz Losigkeit temporarily succeeded him as commander of I. Gruppe.

Western Front and death

Seifert personally appealed to Adolf Galland, the General der Jagdflieger (general of the fighter force) and his former Geschwaderkommodore (wing commander) of JG 26, to be placed on active duty. In consequence, his tour with the RLM ended and he returned to France in September 1943 and was appointed Gruppenkommandeur II. Gruppe of JG 26, replacing Hauptmann Johannes Naumann in this capacity. Naumann had briefly led II. Gruppe following the death of its previous commander Major Wilhelm-Ferdinand Galland, brother of Adolf Galland, on 17 August. Seifert took command of the Gruppe on 9 September, then based at Beauvais–Tillé Airfield. At the time of his posting to II. Gruppe, the Western Allies were executing Operation Cockade, a series of deception operations alleviate German pressure on operations in Sicily and on the Soviets on the Eastern Front. The idea behind Cockade was to force the Luftwaffe into massive air battles with the RAF and United States Army Air Forces (USAAF) VIII Bomber Command that would give the Allies air superiority over Western Europe. As part of this operation, Martin B-26 Marauder bombers attacked Beauvais–Tillé Airfield on 23 September. In defense of this attack, Seifert claimed an escorting Spitfire fighter from the No. 308 Polish Fighter Squadron shot down.

On 10 October, VIII Bomber Command targeted Münster with 274 Boeing B-17 Flying Fortress bombers. Leading his II. Gruppe from Rheine Airfield, Seifert claimed a B-17 shot down northeast of Rheine. Four days later, during the second Schweinfurt raid, Seifert shot down a B-17 bomber from the 305th Bombardment Group, which lost 13 of its 16 aircraft, near Maastricht. On 25 November 1943, Seifert led 6. and 8. Staffel of JG 26 against the USAAF Lockheed P-38 Lightning fighters of the 55th Fighter Group over Lille. The American pilot, Lieutenant Manuel Aldecoa bailed out but his parachute had failed to deploy properly and he fell to his death. Seifert however, never attempted to leave his Fw 190, his body was recovered from the wreckage. Posthumously, he was promoted to the rank of Oberstleutnant (lieutenant colonel).

Summary of career

Aerial victory claims
According to Obermaier,  Seifert was credited with 57 aerial victories claimed in 439 combat missions. Of his 57 aerial victories, 46 were claimed over the Western Front, including three four-engined bombers, and 11 victories over the Eastern Front. Mathews and Foreman, authors of Luftwaffe Aces — Biographies and Victory Claims, researched the German Federal Archives and found records for 55 aerial victory claims, plus two further unconfirmed claims. This figure includes 11 aerial victories on the Eastern Front and 44 over the Western Allies, including two four-engined bombers.

Victory claims were logged to a map-reference (PQ = Planquadrat), for example "PQ 35 Ost 1824". These sectors were then subdivided into 36 smaller units to give a location area 3 × 4 km in size.

Awards
 Honour Goblet of the Luftwaffe (30 December 1940)
 German Cross in Gold on 25 February 1942 as Hauptmann in the I./Jagdgeschwader 26
 Knight's Cross of the Iron Cross on 7 June 1942 as Hauptmann and Gruppenkommandeur of the I./Jagdgeschwader 26 "Schlageter"

Notes

References

Citations

Bibliography

 
 
 
 
 
 
 
 
 
 
 
 
 
 
 
 
 
 
 
 
 
 
 
 Weal, John (1996). 	Focke-Wulf Fw 190 Aces of the Western Front  Oxford: Osprey Publishing Ltd.	 including a colour profile of his aircraft (#28)

1915 births
1943 deaths
People from Pinneberg
People from the Province of Schleswig-Holstein
Luftwaffe pilots
German World War II flying aces
Recipients of the Gold German Cross
Recipients of the Knight's Cross of the Iron Cross
Aviators killed in aviation accidents or incidents in Germany
Luftwaffe personnel killed in World War II
Burials at Bourdon German war cemetery
Military personnel from Schleswig-Holstein